Owuo is the abosom of Death in the Asante and Akan mythology of West Ghana and the Ewe, specifically the Krachi tribe of East Ghana and Togo. He is represented with the Adinkra symbol of a ladder. It is said that he was created by Odomankoma (could also be spelt Odomankama) just so he could kill humans (although, specifically for the Asante and Akan retelling, this attribute comes later during an altercation with Ta Kora, hinting that he might've been created before humans) and possibly other deities, such as Odomankoma himself. He signifies the termination of the creative process in the world, a reference to him killing Odomankoma, the Great Creator

Names 
Owuo is also known as Odomakama Owuo', or the Destroyer (or the Death of Creation), due to his destructive nature of killing mortal life and the fact that he killed Odomankoma, causing Odomankoma to then get resurrected and then live through Nyankapon:Onyankopon onye Odumankoma sunsum ' (literally 'Nyankopon is Odumankoma's personality )Odomankoma would later poison him in an effort to kill him, although it didn't work

Another name for Owuo is Owuo Papa, or the Death fan who blows the "uncertain ones" back into the other world of Samando, the Akan spirit realm and is the generator of whirlwinds inhabited by hostile spirits

Owuo, like many Akan deities, also has a day name, which is Owuo Kwaaku (Death born on Wednesday). This explains Owuo's personality, as those born on Wednesday are said to be full of nsem bone (tricks, bad and acts of evil). This means that Owuo is involved in all forms of death, even the most evil kinds

Personality 
In Akan depictions, Owuo is a truly sadistic and cannibalistic deity who kills without a second thought or care. His first act after being created was to kill his creator and in other tellings of the story he even tried to kill all 3 supreme beings. He is also said to be indestructible. He also tried to claim humanity in an attempt to strike fear into the hearts of people. While not succeeding in his primary task, he did succeed in his secondary goal. He is also greatly associated with evil. Any form of death is brought about by him and it is said that he often blows all kinds of sunsum from Samando, from good sunsum to evil sunsum. Obayifo (Witches) and Obansam (Wizards) and other evil beings such as the Asanbonsam follow him. For all of his negative connotations, he cannot be bribed and actually despises money, displayed by the proverb 'Owuo mpɛ sika (Death doesn't like money). However, due to his birth being on a Wednesday, his personality is the personification of evil to the point that he might also be the Abosom of Bonsam (Abosom of Evil) or one of his followers or even children his the Abosom of Evil. Due to his personality and how it opposes Ta Kora's personality, the two despise one another

In Krachi depictions Owuo's personality shifts to a more kinder tone, taking care of a boy who asked for his help and feeding him to make sure he remained alive although what he fed the boy was human meat and Owuo did kill the two people the boy sent to take his place. Owuo's murderous tendencies in Krachi representation are most likely caused by his taste for human flesh, which he craves. The taste for human flesh can spread to any who has extensively eaten human flesh, with even the boy having a craving for the meat up until when he realized that it was actually human meant he was eating

 Representation 
Owuo has 2 many representations, which are how the Ashanti represent him and how the Krachi represent him.

 General and other representations 
The most widely recognised and the depiction that most likely the Krachi depiction is presented as a monstrous giant with one eye (like that of a cyclops) and a near-naked appearance, save for the large amount of hair that covers his body. He also has long, straight (usually white) hair, which is his second most highlighted feature and is said to extend over many miles, from Krachi to Salaga. It is so big and long that the hair can hold items in it. He has the tusks of a warthog or elephant, and the build of a giant gorilla. His skin colour and/or his fur is red, which is symbolic of death in Africa He may also be depicted as one giant eye. He is a cannibalistic giant who feeds on human flesh and is said to have the power to kill humans by just blinking his eye.

Owuo's other depiction (the one that is most likely the Akan and Asante depiction) is that of an Akan farmer who wields a ubiquitous cutlass that can kill from hundreds in just one slash of the sword, which he is extremely skilled at using to the point that he temporarily killed the Great Creator in the Akan religion, part of the Nyame-Nyankapon-Odomankoma trinity, and fight the Abosom of War to a standstill. This depiction comes from how farmers harvest crops and that they harvest many stalks of crops at once, not just one at a time. He also holds the ladder, Owuo Atwedee, which he has several dead souls climb. He most likely has only one eye but it is unclear if he is a cannibal in this interpretation

His eye is his most distinguishable feature.

He is an extremely powerful deity in the Akan religion, able to fight Ta Kora to a standstill and even kill the great creator for a time in Akan mythology and is involved in every death in both Akan mythos and (believed) in real life. He is one of Ta Kora's rivals and is his main one in terms of life and death.

He is also represented by whirlwinds

He also is naturally gifted with the an extremely potent venom called Death's venom (Owuo Aduro), which can kill anything mortalAsante RepresentationOwuo is represented by the adinkra symbol of a ladder and his name comes from Owuo atwedee baakofoo mforo a proverb meaning “Death’s ladder is not climbed by just one person.”

Owuo is seen as a punisher and one who humans are to be obsessively scared of.

He is also depicted as a farmer who wields a ubiquitous cutlass, that can kill from hundreds in just one slash of the sword, and holds a ladder, Owuo Atwedee. It is most likely that this depiction is the actual Akan and Asante depiction of Owuo, whilst the more monstrous form is originally from Krachi. Ivory horns were also represented as Death due to the sound that is made when they are blown on[4] (they may also represent Owuo via his tusks, as Owuo is depicted as having tusks, and the Ivory horns are made out of elephant tusks). For this, they are often blown at executions and funerals, but not exclusively.[4] They are often decorated with human jawbones. Owuo is also represented as an executioner, although Abrani is the Asante deity of executioners.

A person dies in Akan mythos and in life when Owuo blinks, cuts down with his sword or if the human is an Asante soldier when Owuo races Ta Kora to reach the soul of the dying.Krachi (Ewe) Representation'

In the Krachi representation, Owuo has all of the same physical attributes as the first depiction mentioned in the general representation (see above). It is most likely that the most widely recognized depiction of Owuo, or even the idea of Owuo himself traditionally comes from the Krachi people, although in the days of the Asante Empire, the area that the Krachi people originate from was controlled by the Ashanti and, before that, most likely the Akwamu Empire, so Owuo could've traditionally been an Akan abosom who was adopted by the Krachi due to the culture of the Ashanti Empire. The opposite reason is also possible and is the most likely.

Unlike the Asante, who fear Owuo, the Krachi don't depicted as a malicious creature

Myths 
Owuo has two myths telling on how it tried to kill Odomankoma, its creator:

The creation of Owuo, how Owuo killed Odomankoma and how Ananse became creator and Abosom of Wisdom 
In this story, Odomankoma creates Owuo. After Owuo's creation he quickly overpowers Odomankoma in a fight and kills him. Odomankoma leaves all of his affairs in the hands of his councilors, Nyankapon and Nyame. He then resurrected himself and then, using his power, lives on via Nyankapon, with Nyankapon becoming Odomankoma's personality and representative. Odomankoma then tricks Owuo into drinking Owuo's own poison in an effort to kill him, although it doesn't work.

Later, a great deal of Odomankoma's creative personality was inherited by Ananse, his son. From here, Ananse would become creator, gaining the title Ananse Kokuroko (The Great Spider/Designer) along with Odomankoma, and he, Odomankoma and Nyankapon then finish Odomankoma's legacy, creating much of what Odomankoma couldn't that wasn't heaven as it had already been created. Then they finally create mankind with Ananse/Odomankoma visually creating them and Nyankapon/ Odomankoma breathing life into them. Ananse then taught humans all he knew, gifting him the title, Abosom of Wisdom

How Owuo tried to kill Odomankoma, Nyankapon and Nyame, how immortality was created and how Nyame shared immortality 
After Owuo was created, he gained a powerful venom, Owuo Aduro in Twi, and tried to kill Odomankoma, Nyankapon and Nyame with it. Using his infinite creation abilities, Odomankoma created an antidote to combat and defeat Death's venom. Thus the Supreme Trinity took the antidote and gained eternal life, immune to the effects of Death's venom. When creating humans with Ananse later, part of Nyame's eternal spiritual form was placed into the human sunsum (soul). This spiritual energy is called "kra" and cannot die, giving all humans a piece of immortality

Owuo also has a few myths involving and/or about him, specifically linking to the origin of death, which differ from one person to another. Here are some about him linked to each people, but all link together:

Asante version

Owuo's rivalry with war 
In one story, it was said that Ta Kora got into a feud with the personification of Owuo, the Akan Abosom of death over a competition to catch up with a hunter. Whoever got to him and was invited for supper first would claim humanity. Ta Kora transformed into an antelope and let the hunter chase him before turning around and assuming his mighty abosom form again. He tried to set off with the hunter, but Owuo stopped him. The details of this story change according to the source, ranging from singing to fighting. However, the outcome is the same nonetheless — neither won. They reached an agreement that whenever Ta Kora had to visit the human realm or earth Owuo will accompany him, symbolizing how with war, death comes. In another account, the agreement was different: whosoever arrived first when a human was sick or wounded, specifically in war, will be able to claim their life. So, if Owuo came first, that person's life was forfeited, but if Ta Kora showed up instead, they could continue with their life

Krachi version

When His Eye Shuts, A Man Dies 
It is said that a male Krachi youth encountered Owuo during his travels. At the time, famine was widespread – and the boy was also afflicted by it. When the boy first met Owuo, he was uncertain of his welcome. But Owuo did not attack him – he instead asked the boy what he wanted from Owuo. The boy asked Owuo for food, and the giant granted his wish. However, he asked for a favour in return – the boy must serve Owuo for some time. The boy agreed and Owuo fed him meat, and from then on the boy started becoming Owuo’s servant. After a while, the boy started to miss his hometown. So, he requested a leave from his duties. Owuo eventually acquiesced, with one caveat: The boy must leave another boy in his place. He did as Owuo commanded and left his brother in his stead while he stayed in his hometown for a short holiday. Some time passed, and the boy started missing the meat that Owuo fed him. Thus, he left his hometown once more and returned to Owuo. Owuo welcomed him back and allowed the boy to eat his meat – as long as he started serving Owuo again. Once more, the boy wanted to have a quick visit home. Owuo agreed, as long as the boy prepared him a human wife before he left. So, the boy gave Owuo his sister and left her and a maid while he returned to his hometown. Again, the boy decided to come back to Owuo because he missed the meat. And Owuo accepted him back this time as well, with the same condition: That the boy continues to serve him. However, this time, the boy had a look inside the storage room where Owuo put his meat. Here, he discovered that the meat that he had been eating came from the corpses of his brother, sister, and the maid that accompanied her. In horror, the boy fled back to his hometown and told the people what happened. The people decided to kill the giant by burning his hair. Like lighting a TNT fuse, the fire which started from the ends of his hair quickly travelled to Owuo's head. As the giant fell, the boy realized that a vial of medicine was hidden in his hair. He took it, and as he poured it all over the corpses of his brother, sister, and his sister’s maid, they returned to life. The boy also poured the medicine on Owuo’s eyes – he did not come back to life, but his eyes continued to blink. From then on, whenever Owuo closed his eyes, a person shall die.

References 
https://www.adinkrasymbols.org/symbols/owuo-atwedee/

African mythology
Akan religion
Death gods